Early Dynastic Period may refer to: 
Early Dynastic Period (Egypt)
Early Dynastic Period (Mesopotamia)